Boeberastrum is a genus of flowering plants in the family Asteraceae.

 Species
There are two accepted species, both endemic to the State of Baja California Sur in Mexico.
 Boeberastrum anthemidifolium (Benth.) Rydb.
 Boeberastrum litorale (Brandegee) Rydb. (often misspelled Boeberastrum littoralis)

 formerly included
Boeberastrum concinnum (A.Gray) Rydb., Synonym of Thymophylla concinna (A.Gray) Strother

References

Tageteae
Asteraceae genera
Flora of Baja California Sur